Makeba! is a 1968 album by Miriam Makeba. Liner notes were written by A. B. Spellman who classed the album the “most African of her recent releases".

Track listing
Umoya	3:05
Uyadela	2:25
Asilimanga	1:53
Umquokozo	3:20
U-Mngoma	2:30
Emavungwini (Down In The Dumps)	2:09
Iphi Ndilela	3:40
Singa Madoda	2:45
Magwala Ndini	2:35
Sibongile	2:20
Hamba Naye	2:31

References

1968 albums
Miriam Makeba albums